The 2017–18 season was América's first competitive season and first season in the Liga MX Femenil, the top flight of Mexican women's football.

América managed to qualify to the playoffs on the Apertura 2017 and Clausura 2018 tournaments, but was eliminated in semifinals both times: in the Apertura tournament by rivals Guadalajara and in the Clausura tournament by UANL.

The team was managed by Leonardo Cuéllar, who previously coached Mexico women's national football team from 1998 to 2016.

Squad

Apertura

Clausura

Transfers

In

Out

Coaching staff

Competitions

Overview

Torneo Apertura

League table

Matches

Playoffs

Semifinals

Torneo Clausura

League table

Matches

Playoffs

Semifinals

Statistics

Appearances and goals

|-

|-
! colspan=10 style=background:#dcdcdc | Players that left the club during the season
|-

|}

Goalscorers

Hat-tricks

References

Club América (women) seasons
Mexican football clubs 2017–18 season